Hosmer Dairy Farm Historic District, also known as Walnut Springs Farm, is a historic dairy farm and national historic district located near Marshfield, Webster County, Missouri. The district contains two contributing buildings: a dairy barn (c. 1900) with two attached silos and horse barn (c. 1900).  The dairy barn is a frame bank barn on a limestone block foundation.

It was listed on the National Register of Historic Places in 1996.

References

Historic districts on the National Register of Historic Places in Missouri
Barns on the National Register of Historic Places in Missouri
Buildings and structures in Webster County, Missouri
National Register of Historic Places in Webster County, Missouri